Liolaemus stolzmanni, commonly known as Stolzmann's Pacific iguana, is a species of lizard in the family Liolaemidae.

Etymology
The specific name, stolzmanni, is in honor of Polish zoologist Jean Stanislas Stolzmann.

Distribution
Liolaemus stolzmanni is endemic to Chile, with occurrence noted in the Chilean matorral. Reports from Peru instead represent either Liolaemus pachecoi, Liolaemus poconchilensis, or an undescribed species.

Reproduction
Liolaemus stolzmanni is viviparous.

References

Further reading
Langstroth R (2011). "On the species identities of a complex Liolaemus fauna from the Altiplano and Atacama Desert: insights on Liolaemus stolzmanni, L. reichei, L. jamesi pachecoi, and L. poconchilensis (Squamata: Liolaemidae)". Zootaxa 2809: 20–32.
Steindachner F (1891). "Über einege neue und seltene Reptilien- und Amphibien- Arten ". Sitzungberichte der Kaiserlichen Akademie der Wissenschaften. Mathematisch-Naturwissenschaftliche Classe, Series 1, 100: 291-316 + Plates I-II. (Ctenoblepharis stolzmanni, new species, pp. 297–298). (in German).

reichei
Lizards of South America
Endemic fauna of Chile
Reptiles of Chile
Chilean Matorral
Reptiles described in 1891
Taxa named by Franz Steindachner